WBAB (102.3 FM) is a classic rock radio station licensed to Babylon, New York and owned by Cox Radio. The station is also simulcast on WHFM (95.3 FM) licensed to Southampton, New York and serving eastern Long Island.

History
WBAB first went on the air August 27, 1958 as WBAB-FM. It simulcast WBAB (1440 AM), until September 1975 when 1440 AM adopted a Gospel music format.

2006 signal hijacking
On the morning of Wednesday, May 17, 2006, the station's signal was hijacked for about 90 seconds while the signal jammers broadcast the song "Nigger Hatin' Me" by the 1960s-era white supremacist country singer Johnny Rebel. Roger Luce, the station's morning host, said at the time, "I've never seen this in 22 years at this radio station... Whatever that was - it was very racist."
 
The next morning, it made the front page of Newsday with the headline "JACKED FM". The station's new general manager, John Shea, said, "I've only been here a week and we get hijacked." Former program director John Olsen said, "This was not some child's prank, this was a federal offense."

The hijack was likely accomplished by overpowering the studio transmitter link (STL) signal to the transmitter in Dix Hills, New York. A signal hijacking with the same song happened to WBAB's sister station WBLI about two weeks earlier.

Discography
 WBAB Homegrown Album (1981)
 WBAB Son of Homegrown (1984)

References

External links
 

 

Classic rock radio stations in the United States
Cox Media Group
BAB
Radio stations established in 1958
Mass media in Suffolk County, New York
Babylon (town), New York
1958 establishments in New York (state)